Chinese characters for transcribing Slavonic were Chinese characters created for the purpose of transcribing Slavonic sounds into Chinese. The Russian Orthodox Church's mission in China had an interest in translating liturgical texts into Chinese and Japanese, and sought to devise new characters for this purpose.

Many of these new characters were proposed by Archimandrite Gurias, the 14th head of the Russian mission from 1858–1864. They would have transcribed certain syllables normally not valid in standard Chinese phonology, such as vin, gi, or reia. These characters were later used for transcription into Japanese as well, with the character pronunciations changed to account for Japanese phonology. However, in both China and Japan, leaders of the Russian missions eventually decided to translate liturgical texts using standard vernacular Chinese and katakana, respectively.

The majority of the new characters were composed through combining two existing characters side-by-side as radicals, which would also indicate their pronunciation. Unlike the typical rule of pronouncing the character based on the side radical, used in pronouncing phono-semantic compounds, the radicals are presented in initial-rime pairs. In a method similar to Fanqie, the right-hand character would indicate the syllable initial, while the left-hand character would be used as an indicator of the final. This approach to character formation was intended for vertical reading, where the flow of the text is from top-to-bottom, and ordered from right-to-left. Two exceptions were vertically-arranged characters used as abbreviations of "Christ" and "Jesus".

Twenty Slavonic transcription characters were included in Unicode Standard version 10.0.

Examples

Notes

References

Chinese characters